Harry Woodson (1852 – October 15, 1887) was a professional boxer, nicknamed The Black Diamond, who was active during the 19th century in the Cincinnati area. Due to the political reality of the time Woodson mostly fought other black boxers, but he was good enough that he fought occasional matches with white men as well.

Having earned enough money Woodson would begin to operate his own gymnasium, but he was shot to death in an argument. The source of the conflict was a rivalry over a woman.

See also
List of bare-knuckle boxers

External links
Bio from cyberboxingzone.com
Clipping from the Police Gazette detailing events leading to Woodson's death

1852 births
1887 deaths
Boxers from Cincinnati
Bare-knuckle boxers
American male boxers